Bulbophyllum moratii is a species of orchid in the genus Bulbophyllum. It is critically endangered due to illegal collection and logging.

References

The Bulbophyllum-Checklist
The Internet Orchid Species Photo Encyclopedia

moratii
Species endangered by the pet trade